Pilkington is an English surname, and may refer to:

 Alan Pilkington (born c. 1964), British engineer and Professor
 Alastair Pilkington (1920–1995), British industrialist 
 Anthony Pilkington (born 1988), English footballer who has represented Ireland
 Brian Pilkington (footballer), English footballer
 Brian Pilkington (illustrator) (born 1950), English-Icelandic illustrator and artist
 Charles Pilkington (cricketer, born 1837), English cricketer and clergyman
 Charles Pilkington (cricketer, born 1876), English cricketer
 Charlie Pilkington, Irish-American professional boxer
 Dianne Pilkington (born 1975), English theatre actress and singer
 Danny Pilkington, English footballer
 Declan Pilkington (born 1969), an Irish sportsman
 Doris Pilkington Garimara (born Nugi Garimara in 1937, and also known as Doris Pilkington), Australian author
 Elliot Pilkington, (1890–1945), English footballer
 Esther Pilkington, British performance artist
 Florian Pilkington-Miksa (1950–2021), drummer in the original line-up of the British rock group Curved Air
 Francis Pilkington (c. 1565–1638), English composer, lutenist and singer
 Frederick Thomas Pilkington (1832–1898), British architect 
 George Pilkington (born 1981), English footballer
 George Pilkington Mills (1867–1945), English racing cyclist
 Harry Pilkington (1905–1983), British businessman and academic administrator
 Jackie Pilkington, Irish-American professional boxer
 James Pilkington (bishop) (1520–1576), Bishop of Durham
 Joel Pilkington (born 1984), English footballer
 Johnny Pilkington (born 1970), Irish sportsman
 Karl Pilkington (born 1972), English radio producer and personality
 Kevin Pilkington (born 1974), English footballer
 Konnor Pilkington (born 1997), American baseball player
 Laetitia Pilkington (c. 1709–1750), British poet
 Leonard Pilkington (1527–1599), English academic and clergyman
 Liam Pilkington (1894–1977), Irish activist
 Lorraine Pilkington (born 1975), Irish actress
 Luke Pilkington, Australian football (soccer) player
 Mark Pilkington (golfer) (born 1978), Welsh professional golfer
 Mark Pilkington (writer) (born 1973), English writer
 Matthew Pilkington (1701–1774), Irish author of a standard text on painters which become known as Pilkington's Dictionary
 Mary Pilkington (née Mary Hopkins) (1766–1839), English novelist and poet
 Peter Pilkington, Baron Pilkington of Oxenford (1933–2011), British politician
 Rachel Pilkington (born 1974), Irish actress
 Richard Pilkington (politician, born 1908) (1908–1976), British Conservative politician
 Richard Pilkington (bowls), a former lawn bowls competitor for New Zealand
 Robert Pilkington (1870–1942), Irish politician
 Roger Pilkington (disambiguation), several people
 William Pilkington (architect) (1758–1848), English architect

English-language surnames
Irish families